Pascal was a French Navy  of the M6 ​​series commissioned in 1931. She participated in World War II, first on the side of the Allies from 1939 to June 1940, then in the navy of Vichy France until she was scuttled at Toulon in November 1942. She was never again seaworthy, but the Italians seized her and refloated her, and the Germans later took control of her. She was sunk in March 1944.

Characteristics

Pascal was part of a fairly homogeneous series of 31 deep-sea patrol submarines also called "1,500-tonners" because of their displacement. All entered service between 1931 and 1939.

They displaced  on the surface and  underwater. When submerged, their two electric motors produced a combined  and allowed them to reach .

Construction and commissioning

Authorized in the 1925 naval program, Pascal was laid down at Arsenal de Brest in Brest, France, on 8 June 1926 with the hull number Q138. She was launched on 19 July 1928 and commissioned on 10 September 1931.

Service history

1931–1939

From 1930, the French Navy equipped several of its submarines — including Pascal — with hydrophones mounted in front of the forward diving planes and connected to a compesator.

World War II

French Navy
At the start of World War II in September 1939, Pascal was assigned to the 4th Submarine Division in the 1st Squadron, home-ported at Brest.

The patrols were cancelled on 5 September, when German forces were reported back in their bases.

In November and December 1939, Pascal and Henri Poincaré  patrolled in the Atlantic Ocean south of the Azores in search of German U-boats and their supply ships. On either 17 November or 17 December 1939, according to different sources, Pascal crew boarded the Italian ocean liner  to check her passengers — among whom were eight Germans, seven of them German Jews — before allowing her to proceed. From 21 to 25 November 1939, the two submarines searched for the German cargo ship Rekum, based on an erroneous report that she had put to sea from Santa Cruz de Tenerife on Tenerife in the Canary Islands.

At 07:00 on 16 January 1940, Pascal fired a warning shot at a merchant ship her crew suspected of being a blockade runner. After the ship stopped, Pascal′s crew determined that she was the British steam cargo ship  and released her to continue her voyage.

Accordingly, Pascal began to operate from Bizerte.

German ground forces advanced into France on 10 May 1940, beginning the Battle of France, and Italy declared war on France on 10 June 1940 and joined the invasion. On 13 June, Pascal and Le Centaure got underway for a patrol south of Sardinia between 38 degrees 10 minutes North and 38 degrees 30 minutes North. That day, Pascal crash-dived and avoided damage when an Italian plane attacked her, dropping three bombs. Pascal and Le Centaure sighted no ships during their patrol. When the Battle of France ended in France's defeat and an armistice with Germany and Italy that went into effect on 25 June 1940, Pascal was on patrol in the Mediterranean Sea south of the Strait of Messina.

Vichy France
After France's surrender, Pascal served in the naval forces of Vichy France, initially remained assigned to the 4th Submarine Division at Bizerte. By 1 August 1940, she had been reassigned along  with Henri Poincaré to the 5th Submarine Division at Bizerte.

As of 1 January 1942, Pascal was assigned to the 5th Submarine Division at Casablanca in French Morocco along with Fresnel, Henri Poincaré, and their sister ship . In early 1942, she departed French Morocco to undergo a major overhaul at La Ciotat, France. The overhaul took eight months, during which time she was placed under guard in a disarmed and unfueled state in accordance with the terms of the Armistice of 22 June 1940. After Allied forces landed in French North Africa on 8 November 1942 in Operation Torch, she was authorized to rearm for the defense of Toulon, France, against Allied attack. Her refit was completed on 16 November 1942.

Moored at Berth 9 at the Darse Nord du Mourillon at Toulon with her diesel engines still disassembled, Pascal was not able get underway when Germany and Italy occupied the Free Zone of Vichy France on 27 November 1942, and she was among the French vessels scuttled at Toulon to prevent their seizure by Germany when German forces entered Toulon that day. She sank before German troops could reach her and attempt to prevent her scuttling.

Italy and Germany
The Germans seized Pascal and handed her over to the Italians, who refloated her on either 20 January 1943 or 5 June 1943, according to different sources. The Germans seized her when Italy surrendered to the Allies and switched to the Allied side in accordance with the terms of the Armistice of Cassibile on 9 September 1943. The Germans declared her unusable. Allied aircraft sank her at Toulon on 11 March 1944.

References

Citations

Bibliography

 
 
 
 

Redoutable-class submarines (1928)
1928 ships
Ships built in France
World War II submarines of France
Maritime incidents in November 1942
Maritime incidents in March 1944
Shipwrecks of France
Shipwrecks of Italy
World War II warships scuttled at Toulon
Lost submarines of France
Naval ships of France captured by Italy during World War II